Willy Burkhard (17 April 1900 – 18 June 1955) was a Swiss composer and academic teacher, influential in both capacities. He taught music theory at the Berne Conservatory and the Zürich Conservatory. His works include an opera, oratorios, cantatas, and many instrumental genres from piano pieces to symphonies.

Life 
Burkhard was born in Evilard, Canton of Bern. He attended and graduated from a teachers' training college . He also study with Ernst Graf, organist at the Berner Münster. He moved to Leipzig to study piano with Robert Teichmüller and composition with Sigfrid Karg-Elert. After Leipzig, he moved on to Munich to study with Walter Courvoisier and later to Paris to work with Max d'Ollone.

From 1924, he began teaching composition, theory and the piano in Berne. He conducted several choirs and small orchestras there. In 1932 he was struck with tuberculosis, and was compelled to live for several years in Montana and Davos. During that time, he turned more towards composition. In 1950 he received a prize from the Schweizerischer Tonkünstlerverein (Swiss Association of Musicians). He died in Zürich in 1955 at the age of 55.

Work 
He began to compose in late-Romantic style. His personal style developed from 1930, comparable to Paul Hindemith and Frank Martin. Late in life, he used some features of twelve-tone composition, but remained within tonality. He was interested to compose for voices, and regarded for renovated sacred music.

Burkhard is known for sacred choral music, including oratorios Das Gesicht Jesajas (Isaiah's vision) and Das Jahr (The year), and the cantata Die Sintflut (The Flood). He composed an opera, Die Schwarze Spinne based on Gotthelf's novella The Black Spider. He wrote song settings for solo voice and choirs, chamber music and piano works. His orchestral music was often dedicated to Paul Sacher's Sinfonietta, including a Violin Concerto, and two symphonies.

Dramatic works 
 Im Zeichen des Kreuzes, incidental music, 1938–9
 Laupenspiel, Op. 56, radio score, 1939
 Oedipus rex, Op. 72, incidental music to Oedipus Rex by Sophocles, speaking choruses, wind instruments, timpani, 1944
 Die schwarze Spinne, text by R. Faesi and G. Boner based on Gotthelf's The Black Spider, Op. 80, 1948, rev. 1954

Accompanied choral works 
 Choral duets, Op. 22/1, text by Christian Morgenstern, men's choir, tpt, trombones, Op. 22/2, text by Conrad Ferdinand Meyer, choir, vn, fl, 1926–28
 Till Ulenspiegel, cantata, Op. 24, T, B, male chorus, orch, 1929
 Vorfrühling, cantata, text by Morgenstern, Op. 27, chorus, str, 1930
 Te Deum, Op. 33, choir 2vv, tpt, trombone, timp, org, 1931
 Spruchkantate, Op. 38, text by Joseph von Eichendorff, male chorus, str, 1933
 Musikalische Übung, Op. 39, Psalm 12 translate by Martin Luther, choir and organ, 1934
 Das Gesicht Jesajas, oratorio, Op. 41, solo voice, choir, organ and orchestra, 1933–5
 Die Versuchung Jesu, cantata, Op. 44, A/B, unison vv ad lib, org, 1936
 Ps xciii, Op. 49, Psalm 17, unison vv, org, 1937
 Genug ist nicht genug, cantata, text by Meyer, Op. 53, chorus, 2 tpt, timp, str, 1938–9
 Lob der Musik, cantata, Op. 54, solo vv, chorus, orch, c1939
 Cantate Domino, Op. 61/2, S, chorus, str, timp, 1940
 Heimatliche Kantate, text by Gottfried Keller, Op. 61/3, Mez/Bar, unison vv ad lib, orch, 1940
 Kreuzvolk der Schweiz, text by Meyer, Op. 61/4, chorus, org, 1941
 Das Jahr, oratorio, text by H. Hiltbrunner, Op. 62, solo vv, chorus, orch, 1942
 Christi Leidensverkündigung, cantata, Op. 65, T, small chorus, org, 1942
 Cantique de notre terre, text by J. P. Zimmermann, Op. 67, solo vv, chorus, orch, 1943
 Mass, Op. 85, soprano, bass, choir and orchestra, 1951
 Psalmen-Kantate, Op. 90, S, chorus, org, chbr orch, 1952
 Ps clxviii, Op. 96, Psalm ?, unison vv, insts, 1954

Unaccompanied choral works 
 2 Choruses, Op. 2, 1923
 Cantata, text from the Bible, Op. 3, tenor and choir, 1923
 Motets, Op. 10, boys' choir, 1925
 8 Sprüche aus dem ‘Cherubinischen Wandersmann’, 2 sets, Op. 17/1, text by Angelus Silesius, 1927
 Ezzolied, Op. 19, motet, 1927
 5 Gesänge, text by Richard Dehmel, Op. 26, 1930
 24 Melodien aus den Hassler’schen Choralgesängen, Op. 30, 4vv, 1931
 Das deutsche Sanctus, 2 unison choruses, 1932
 Neue Kraft, suite, text from the Bible etc., Op. 34, 1932
 4 Choruses, Op. 35, male chorus, 1936
 Der Tod, chorus 4vv, 1933
 Vermahnlied, 2–4vv, 1934
 Bärnerlüt, male chorus 4vv, 1935
 2 Gesänge, chorus 4vv, 1936
 Choruses, Op. 47, male chorus, 1936
 Die Verkündigung Mariä, motet, Op. 51, 1938
 5 Choräle, chorus, 1939
 Sommerzeit, Op. 61/1, 1940
 9 folksong arrangements, s. and chorus, female chorus, 1942
 2 Choruses: Mon âme, bénis l’éternel, Oui, glorifiez l’éternel, 1942
 Kleiner Psalter, Op. 82, 1949
 Frühlingsglaube, text by Keller, male chorus, 1950
 Wer das längere Lebensteil wünscht, male chorus 4vv, 1950
 2 Gesänge, 2vv, 1952
 Die Sintflut, cantata, Op. 97, chorus 8vv, 195

Orchestral works 
 Violin Concerto No. 1, Op. 7, 1925
 Suite aus der Musik zu einem Weihnachtsmärchen, Op. 12, 1926
 Symphony, Op. 21, 1926–8
 Ulenspiegel-Variationen, Op. 37 [prelude to op.24], 1932
 Fantasy, Op. 40, str, 1934
 Kleine Serenade, Op. 42, str, 1935
 Concerto, Op. 50, str, 1939
 Hymnus, Op. 57, 1939
 Concertino, Op. 60, vc, str, 1940
 Violin Concerto No. 2, Op. 69, 1943
 Symphony No. 2 (one movement), Op. 73, 1944
 Concerto, Op. 74, org, str, brass, 1945
 Konzertstück, Op. 75, org, orch, 1945
 Canzona, Op. 76, 2 fl, low str, 1945
 Kleine konzertante Suite, Op. 79, 1946
 Piccola sinfonia giocosa, Op. 81, small orchestra, 1949
 Fantasia mattutina, Op. 83, 1949; Toccata, op.86, 1951
 Sonata da camera, Op. 89, str, perc, 1952
 Viola Concerto, Op. 93, 1953
 Concertino, Op. 94, 2 fl, hpd, str, 1954
 Divertimento, Op. 95, str, 1954

 Chamber music 
 Fantasie, Op. 1, pf, 1922
 Variationen über ein Volkslied, Op. 8, pf, 1925
 Inventionen, Op. 14, pf, 1926
 String Trio No, 1, Op. 13, 1 movt, 1926
 Kleine zweistimmige Suite, Op. 14a [arr. op.14], 11 insts, 1926
 3 Preludes and Fugues, Op. 16, pf, 1927
 2 Trio Sonatas, Op. 18, org, 1927
 Kleine Serenade, Op. 15, vn, va, 1927
 Stinis Puppe Theresli, pf, 1928
 String Quartet No. 1, Op. 23, 1929
 Variations on a *Minuet by Haydn", Op. 29, pf, 1930
 Variations on Chorale settings by Hassler, Op. 28, org, 1930
 Kleine Stücke, Op. 31, pf, 1931
 Fantasie, v32, org, 1931
 Wer nur den lieben Gott lässt walten, partita, org, 1932
 Grosser Gott wir loben dich, partita, org, 1932
 Praeludium und Fuge, E, org, 1932
 Was die Hirten alles erlebten, pf, 1935
 Piano Trio, Op. 43, 1936
 Sonatina, Op. 45, vn, pf, 1936
 Suite, Op. 48, 2 vn, 1937
 8 kleine Klavierstücke, 1938
 Sonatina, Op. 52, org, 1938
 Fantasy and Chorale "Ein feste Burg", op.58, org, 1939
 Sonata, Op. 59, va, 1939
 Etude concertante, vc, pf, 1940
 Sonatina, pf, 1940 
 Weichnachtssonatine, Op. 71/1, pf, 1940
 Sonata, Op. 66, pf, 1943
 String Quartet No. 2, Op. 68, 1943
 Suite en miniature, Op. 71/2, vn, pf, 1944
 Serenade, Op. 71/3, fl, gui, c1945
 Serenade, Op. 77, fl, cl, bn, hn, vn, va, db, hp, 1945
 4 Intermezzi, Op. 77a, hp, 1945
 Sonata, Op. 78, vn, pf, 1946
 Canzona, Op. 76a, 2 fl/fl, ob, pf/org, 1947
 Sonata, Op. 87, vc, pf, 1952
 Lyrische Musik, Op. 88, fl, va, vc, pf, c1952
 Choral-Triptychon, Op. 91, org, 1953
 Serenade, Op. 92, fl, cl, 1953
 Suite, Op. 98, fl, 1955
 6 Preludes, Op. 99, pf, 1955
 Romanze, hn, pf

 Solo vocal music 
 7 Songs, Op. 4, 1v, pf, 1924–5
 6 Songs, Op. 5, 1v, pf, 1923–5
 4 Nachtlieder, Op. 6, 1v, pf, 1924
 Frage, Op. 9, song cycle, 1v, pf, 1925
 3 Duets, Op. 11, text by Friedrich Hebbel, 2S, vn, 1926
 2 Rilke Cycles, Op. 20/1, B, chbr orch, op.20/2, S, chbr orch, 1927
 10 Songs, Op. 25, 1v, pf, 1930
 Herbst, cantata, text by Morgenstern, Op. 36, S, pf trio, 1932
 Das ewige Brausen, text by K. L. Hamsun, Op. 46, B, orch, 1936
 Der Sonntag, cantata, text by Gotthelf, Op. 63, Mez/Bar, pf trio, 1942
 Magnificat, Op. 64, S, org, 1942, arr. as op.64a, S, str, 1942
 9 Songs, Op. 70, text by Morgenstern, 1v, pf, 1943
 Und als der Tag der Pfingsten erfüllt war, Op. 84, A/B, org, 1951
 Psalmenmusik'', soprano and orchestra, 1953

References

External links 
 
 
 
 Willy Burkhard (in German) paul-sacher-stiftung.ch
 Willy Burkhard (Composer) Bach Cantatas Website
 

1900 births
1955 deaths
People from Biel/Bienne District
20th-century classical composers
Swiss classical composers
Swiss opera composers
Swiss male classical composers
20th-century male musicians
20th-century Swiss composers